Porto Alegre may refer to:
Porto Alegre, a municipality that is also capital of the state of Rio Grande do Sul in Brazil.
Porto Alegre Metro, a metro operated jointly by the federal government, the state government of Rio Grande do Sul and the city of Porto Alegre, Brazil.
Porto Alegre Futebol Clube, a Brazilian football club from Porto Alegre, Brazil.
Porto Alegre, São Tomé and Príncipe, a municipality on São Tomé Island in Caué District in São Tomé and Príncipe.
Porto Alegre Airport,  an airport serving the municipality of Porto Alegre on São Tomé Island in São Tomé and Príncipe.

See also
Portalegre (disambiguation)